P.T.B. is the second studio album from the group Kingspade. P.T.B. stands for P-Town Ballers. The album debuted at No. 7 on the Billboard Top Independent chart.

Track listing
Intro
Who Run This?
Takin It Back
Neighborhood Trends
That's The Sh*t
We Ridin'
Lookin Up
Havin Fun
Bring The Crowd
Brotha Brotha
Check Yo Bitch
Follow The Leader
That's How It Goes
Dreams
Inked Up

Singles
"Who Run This?"
"We Ridin"
"That's How It Goes"

2007 albums
Kingspade albums
Suburban Noize Records albums